The Roman Catholic Diocese of Simla and Chandigarh is a diocese located in the cities of Simla and Chandigarh in the Ecclesiastical province of Delhi in India.

History
 4 June 1959: Established as Diocese of Simla from the Metropolitan Archdiocese of Delhi and Simla
 12 May 1964: Renamed as Diocese of Simla and Chandigarh

Leadership
 Bishops of Simla and Chandigarh (Latin Rite)
 Bishop Ignatius Loyola Mascarenhas (10 February 2009 – present)
 Bishop Gerald John Mathias (22 December 1999 – 8 November 2007)
 Bishop Gilbert Blaize Rego (11 March 1971 – 10 November 1999)
 Bishop Alfred Fernández (13 April 1967 – 25 June 1970)
 Archbishop Joseph Alexander Fernandes (Apostolic Administrator 1966 – 13 April 1967)
 Bishop John Burke (12 May 1964 – 3 August 1966)
 Bishops of Simla (Latin Rite)
 Bishop John Burke (4 June 1959 – 12 May 1964)

References
 GCatholic.org
 Catholic Hierarchy
 Website of the diocese

See also
 Immaculate Heart Church, (Karnal)

Roman Catholic dioceses in India
Christianity in Himachal Pradesh
Religion in Chandigarh
Christian organizations established in 1959
Roman Catholic dioceses and prelatures established in the 20th century
1959 establishments in Himachal Pradesh